Elater ferrugineus, the rusty click beetle, is a species of click beetle belonging to the family Elateridae.

Varietas
Varietas include:
 Elater ferrugineus var. morio Schilsky, 1888 
 Elater ferrugineus var. occitanicus de Villers, 1789

Distribution
This species is widespread in the Western Palearctic realm.

Description
This species is rather variable. Head is dark brown. Pronotum and elytra of males are usually bright orange or reddish, while females show a uniform dark brown color and are smaller than males. The legs are black. The antennae are mid-brown to black. In males they extend up to the posterior edge of the pronotum, while in females they are shorter.

Biology
Larvae develop in hole of ancient trees of various species, mainly oak (Quercus robur), ash (Fraxinus excelsior), beech (Fagus sylvatica) and elm (Ulmus spp.). The life cycle lasts 4–6 years. Pupation occurs in spring. These larvae are predatory. They especially prey on hermit beetle (Osmoderma eremita) and rose chafer (Cetonia aurata).

When male E. ferrugineus are attracted to a female, they release compounds that attract other males to the site. These compounds include geranyl, nerylacetone and 6-methyl-5-heptene-2-one. Attraction of males only occurs in the presence of females, ensuring increased mating opportunities.

References

Elateridae
Beetles described in 1758
Taxa named by Carl Linnaeus